Llangystennin (sometimes spelt Llangwstennin) is a rural parish to the south-east of Llandudno and Llanrhos in Conwy County Borough, north Wales.

Llangystennin includes Llangwstennin Hall, the villages of Mochdre, Pabo and Bryn Pydew and the small town of Llandudno Junction.

The parish takes its name from St. Cystennin (Constantine) who is said to be a son of St. Helen of Caernarfon (Elen Luyddog) together with whom and with his brother St. Peblig he is credited with introducing into Wales in the 5th century the Celtic form of monasticism from Gaul.

Notable people
Margaret Lloyd (Moravian) (1709-1762)

Llandudno
Villages in Conwy County Borough